Nuts is an album by Kevin Gilbert, which was released posthumously in 2009.  It is a collection of unreleased material from Gilbert's career, which was released simultaneously with Bolts.

Track listing
 "The World Just Gets Smaller" - 5:45 	
 "While Heroes Cry" - 3:53 	
 "Until I Get Her Back" - 5:22 	
 "When Strangers Part" - 3:48 	
 "Finally Over You" - 4:19 	
 "Circling Winds" - 3:29 	
 "Shannon Elizabeth" - 3:10 	
 "A Tired Old Man" - 4:20 	
 "Childhood's End" - 4:45 	
 "Joy Town" (Acoustic Version) - 4:30 	
 "Kashmir" (Studio Version, written by Jimmy Page and Robert Plant) - 4:27

Personnel
Kevin Gilbert – vocals, guitar, bass, piano, keyboards, programming, sequencing
Russ Parrish – Bass Guitar on "Joy Town"
Nick D'Virgilio – percussion on "Joy Town"
T.A. Ronn – Resonator Guitar on "Joy Town"
Toss Panos – Drum on "Kashmir"
Corky James–  Guitar on "Kashmir"
Satnam Ramgotra –  Goblet Drum on "Kashmir"
David Kerzner –  Synthesizer on "Kashmir"

References

External links
Nuts review at prognaut.com
Nuts on progarchives.com

2009 albums
Kevin Gilbert albums
Albums published posthumously